Géédy Dayaan or Geedy Dayaan is an album by Senegalese (later Senegambian) band Super Diamono in 1979, under their new name at the time, Super Jamano de Dakar. It was released on Disques Griot. The album was recorded at the Jandeer, a night club in Dakar. 

Omar Pene, the lead vocalist of the band, and one of its original members, was given little room to showcase his vocals by the band's management. Critics such as Mazzoleni describe the album as "a rather tasteless mixture of rock, reggae, synthetic strings and 'African percussion' influences"

Tracks

Artists and credits
Alto saxophone – Ndiaga Samb, Tonia Lô
Backing vocals – Amadou Baye Diagne, Bassirou Diagne
Bass – Baïla Diagne
Drums – El Hadj Ousmane Diagne
Guitar – Bob Sène
Organ, synthesizer, piano – Papa Basse
Percussion – Aziz Seck
Trombone – Moustapha Fall
Trumpet – Cheikh Sadibou Niasse
Lead vocals – Omar Pène

References

Senegalese music
Gambian music
Senegalese musical groups
Serer musicians
Wolof-language singers